Darling Darling is a 2000 Indian Malayalam-language comedy-drama film directed by Rajasenan and written by Udayakrishna and Siby K. Thomas. This love triangle movie starred Dileep, Vineeth and Kavya Madhavan. The movie was remade in Kannada in 2001 as Jodi and in Telugu in 2001 under the same name.

Plot
Subhash Chandra Bose, aka Kochu Kurup hears a phone call from a teenage girl named Padmaja "Pappi" Warrier and soon falls in love with her. But his parents send him to Bangalore to meet his best friend Kartik, aka Aniyankutty, who is a rich womanizer. Aniyankutty also falls in love with Pappi, but he does not disclose this to Kochu Kurup. Kochu Kurup's father brings a marriage alliance to him, but he says that he is not interested, not knowing that the alliance is with Pappi herself. However, Kartik gets to know this, and he helps Kochu Kurup to cancel the wedding since he has an eye on her.

Kochu Kurup and Pappi try to elope before the marriage, unaware that the marriage scheduled for them was with each other. Aniyankutty stops Kurup on the way with the help of thugs so that instead of Kurup he can reach the railway station and take Pappi with him. But the family intervenes and Aniyankutty is beaten by the thugs. Pappi reaches the railway station and waits for Kochu Kurup, but when he doesn't show up Pappi tries to commit suicide walking down the railway track. Then Kochu Kurup shows up late and tries to find Pappi, but he couldn't. Then he realizes Pappi is going to commit suicide and runs to save her from the train, but he is far behind. Aniyankutty wakes up from being hit by the goons and sees Pappi walking down the railway track and the train is closing in. Aniyankutty runs and saves Pappi from the train just in time. Kochu Kurup thought Pappi was dead, but as the train passes by he sees that Aniyankutty saved her and explains everything to her. Pappi and Kochu Kurupp unite as Aniyankutty leaves to Bangalore.

Cast

Music
Ouseppachan composed the soundtrack and background score for this movie. One of Ouseppachan's tunes as a background score in the 1991 Malayalam movie Ulladakkam became a song in this movie, i.e., Pranaya Sougandhikangal. Lyrics by S. Ramesan Nair.

 "Aniyampoo Muttathu" - M. G. Sreekumar, Santhosh Keshav
 "Aniyampoo Muttathu" [Instrumental] - Ouseppachan
 "Chithirappanthalittu" - K. J. Yesudas, K. S. Chitra
 "Darling Darling" (Version I) - S. P. Balasubrahmanyam
 "Darling Darling" (Version II) - Hariharan
 "Muthum Pavizhavum" (Version I) - Hariharan, Sujatha Mohan
 "Muthum Pavizhavum" (Version I) - Sreenivas, Sujatha Mohan
 "Pranaya Sowgandhikangal" [D] - Santhosh Keshav, K. S. Chitra
 "Pranaya Sowgandhikangal" [F] - K. S. Chitra
 "Pranaya Sowgandhikangal" [M] - Santhosh Keshav

References

External links
 

2000 films
2000s Malayalam-language films
2000s musical comedy-drama films
2000 romantic comedy-drama films
Films scored by Ouseppachan
Indian buddy comedy films
2000s romantic musical films
Indian romantic comedy-drama films
Indian romantic musical films
Malayalam films remade in other languages
Indian musical comedy-drama films
Films directed by Rajasenan
2000 comedy films
2000 drama films
Films shot in Thrissur